Survival of the Sickest: The Surprising Connections Between Disease and Longevity is a 2007 New York Times Bestselling science book by Sharon Moalem, an evolutionary biologist and neurogeneticist,  and Jonathan Prince, senior advisor and speechwriter for the Clinton administration. It was originally titled, Survival of the Sickest: A Medical Maverick Discovers Why We Need Disease.

Overview
The book is a collection of case studies, which use scientific and historical data to support the individual proposed hypotheses, and the overall argument for a connection between some illnesses and increased longevity. Or, how many of the medical conditions that are diseases were the result of evolutionary changes that gave our ancestors a "leg up in the survival sweepstakes."

It contains 266 pages all leading up to part 3.
Chapter 1: Hemochromatosis, bloodletting, and human iron consumption
Chapter 2: Diabetes, climate change, and brown fat
Chapter 3: Sunlight, vitamin D, cholesterol, and the physiological makeup of race
Chapter 4: Vegetables, fava beans, and the spread of malaria
Chapter 5: The virulence of bacteria, Guinea worms, and parasitic diseases
Chapter 6: Mutating DNA and “jumping” genes
Chapter 7: Genetic suppression and childhood obesity
Chapter 8: Cancer cells and childbirth

Moalem includes an introduction in which he describes how and why he became interested in the medical sciences. The 2008 paperback edition contains a section entitled "P.S. Insights, Interviews, & More...".  Moalem includes recommendations of related books.

Reception
Survival of the Sickest debuted on the New York Times bestselling book list and was featured on NBC's Today Show, Comedy Central's The Daily Show with Jon Stewart, and NPR's The Diane Rehm Show.

References

External links 
 Harpercollins website listing
 Amazon.com listing with Publishers Weekly review

2007 non-fiction books
Popular science books
Medical books
HarperCollins books